The Great Northern Q-1 was a class of 30 2-10-2 "Santa Fe" type steam locomotives built by the Baldwin Locomotive Works in 1923 and operated by the Great Northern Railway pulling freight until the late 1950s.

History
When the Great Northern received the locomotives, they hauled freight across the system and were rated at pulling 3,000 tons between Whitefish, Montana and Shelby, Montana. Nos. 2101, 2107 and 2120 were assigned to the Mesabi Division ore-steaming on August 20, 1951. However, they would soon be replaced by diesel locomotives and retirement started on January 31, 1950. By May 1958, all have been retired.

Disposition
None of the Q-1s have been preserved.

Roster

References

Great Northern Railway (U.S.)
2-10-2 locomotives
Baldwin locomotives
Freight locomotives
Scrapped locomotives
Railway locomotives introduced in 1923
Q-1
Standard gauge locomotives of the United States
Steam locomotives of the United States